FantaMorph is a morphing software for the creation of photo morphing pictures and sophisticated morph animation effects. The category of this software is Image Editor or Animation in Graphics or Multimedia. FantaMorph supports both Windows and Mac operating system, and comes in three different editions: Standard, Professional and Deluxe.

Some applications
For Fun: FantaMorph is used to visually show the changing of the same object or the transformation between different things.

Do Research: FantaMorph works to identify the changes in the facial expression in some Psychological researches.

Face Image Processing: Based on the features of “Face Locator” and “Face Mixer”, FantaMorph helps users to automatically detect the facial features (eyes, nose, mouth, etc.) and mix the feature/shape of multiple real faces to compose a virtual face.

Notes

References 
Reginald B. Adams, Nalini Ambady, Ken Nakayama (2010). "The science of social vision". OXFORD University Press. 335(471).
Feusner Jamie D (2010). "Inverted face processing in body dysmorphic disorder". Journal of Psychiatric Research. 44(15):1088-1094.
A. Sedda, V (2010). "Motion influences emotion, but also structural facial features recognition". Behavioural Neurology. 23(4):253-254.
Emily C. Forscher (2012). "Hemispheric Asymmetry and Visuo-Olfactory Integration in Perceiving Subthreshold (Micro) Fearful Expressions". The Journal of Neuroscience. 32(6):2159-2165.
Noah Z. Schwartz (2007). "Reconsidering face specialization and face inversion". University of Southern California Psychology: Doctor of Philosophy. 22(72).
Xuan Zou (2008). "A morphing system for effective human face recognition". Visual Information Engineering. VIE 2008:215-220.
James R. Roney (2011). "Changes in estradiol predict within-women shifts in attraction to facial cues of men's testosterone". Psychoneuroendocrinology. 36(15):742-749.
SA Rao (2010). "More than meets the eye: Digital fraud in dentistry". Journal of Indian Society of Pedodontics and Preventive Dentistry. 28(4):241-244. 
Hyoung-Dong Park (2010). "EEG oscillations reflect visual short-term memory processes for the change detection in human faces". NeuroImage. 53(2):629-637.
2013 TopTenReviews: Morphing Software
CNET Editors' review: FantaMorph
Top-best-morphing-software By CEO World Magazine review

External links 
 

Photo software